Ventsislav Yordanov (born 15 January 1986)  is a Bulgarian footballer who plays for Dunav Ruse as a defender.

References

External links 
Profile at soccerway.com

Living people
1986 births
Bulgarian footballers
Association football defenders
PFC Vidima-Rakovski Sevlievo players
FC Etar 1924 Veliko Tarnovo players
PFC Ludogorets Razgrad players
PFC Svetkavitsa players
FC Lyubimets players
First Professional Football League (Bulgaria) players